Howard Winchel "Hawk" Koch Jr. (born December 14, 1945) is an American film producer, the former president of both the Academy of Motion Picture Arts and Sciences and the Producers Guild of America, and a former road manager for the musical groups The Supremes and The Dave Clark Five. Koch is the author of the book Magic Time: My Life in Hollywood published in 2019.

Koch serves on the board of directors for AMC Entertainment, the Motion Picture and Television Fund, the Producers Guild of America, and the National Film Preservation Foundation.

Early life
Koch was born to a non-religiousJewish family in Los Angeles, California. He was raised in the film business, the son of Ruth (Pincus) and producer/director/actor Howard Winchel Koch, Sr. He graduated from Beverly Hills High School in 1963.

Career
Hawk Koch began his career in London, working for music impresario and co-owner of The Dave Clark Five Harold Davison, as a road manager for visiting American acts. Koch returned from London to manage The Dave Clark Five's 1964 United States tour. After his time in the music business, Hawk Koch turned to filmmaking in Hollywood, working as assistant director for a number of directors and later as a producer.

Koch has been intimately involved with the making of more than 60 major motion pictures, including Chinatown, Heaven Can Wait, Marathon Man, The Way We Were, Primal Fear, Wayne’s World, Peggy Sue Got Married, and Rosemary's Baby. His colleagues and collaborators have included Sidney Pollack, Roman Polanski, John Schlesinger, Francis Ford Coppola, and Warren Beatty. Hawk has worked with  Natalie Wood, Laurence Olivier, Dustin Hoffman, Jack Nicholson, Barbra Streisand, Anthony Hopkins, Whoopi Goldberg,  Diane Lane, Edward Norton, and Halle Berry.

At the Producers Guild of America (PGA), Koch and co-president Mark Gordon led the fight to preserve the producer's credit and secured all the major film studios and major independent film studios to agree to uphold the Producer's Mark (p.g.a.). In 2010, Koch and Gordon were the first pair of co-presidents to be elected by the PGA membership. The duo was re-elected in 2012.

On July 31, 2012, Koch was elected president of the Academy of Motion Picture Arts and Sciences, making Hawk and his father the only father-son pair to lead the Academy in its history. On August 1, 2012, Koch took leave from his post at the PGA in order to assume the Academy's presidency, later rejoining Mark Gordon as PGA co-president in August 2013. During his tenure at the Academy, Koch spearheaded several initiatives including a call for diversity, launching the first general membership meeting in its history, sharpening the focus on member engagement and the future of filmmaking, implementing the Academy's digital voting system, and securing major fundraising for the Academy Museum of Motion Pictures.

Koch has given one-on-one talks with Francis Coppola, Tom Cruise, and Jake Gyllenhaal at the annual Produced by Conference, and he has been a featured speaker at the Sarajevo Film Festival, the South Dakota Film Festival, and the Beijing International Film Festival. He delivered the 2013 commencement address at Chapman University Dodge College of Film and Media Arts, and was a featured speaker at the 2019 Renaissance Weekend.

Koch is a vocal advocate for diversity and representation in film and television as well as diversity within the entertainment industry's professional guilds and organizations. As of 2020, Koch serves on the board of directors for AMC Entertainment, Cast and Crew, the Motion Picture and Television Fund, the Producers Guild of America, and the National Film Preservation Foundation.

Personal life
Koch is married to Jungian analyst and writer Molly Jordan Koch. He was previous married to Rita Litter, mother of his children Billy Koch and Emily Anne Koch; to Marcia (no last name given), mother of Robby Koch; and to actress Joanna Pacuła.

Filmography
He was a producer in all films unless otherwise noted.

Film

Second unit director or assistant director

Miscellaneous crew

Production manager

As an actor

Thanks

Television

Miscellaneous crew

Production manager

References

External links

1945 births
20th-century American Jews
21st-century American Jews
21st-century American memoirists
Beverly Hills High School alumni
Film directors from Los Angeles
Film producers from California
Living people
Presidents of the Academy of Motion Picture Arts and Sciences